North Attleborough, alternatively spelled North Attleboro, is a town in Bristol County, Massachusetts, United States. The population was 30,834 at the 2020 United States Census.

The villages of Attleboro Falls and North Attleborough Center are located in the town.

History

In pre-Colonial times, the land was the site of the Bay Path, a major Native American trail to Narragansett Bay, the Seekonk River, and Boston. English settlers arrived in the area in 1634 and established the settlement of Rehoboth—which included the modern day towns of North Attleborough, Attleboro, Somerset, Seekonk, as well as parts of Rhode Island—from land sold to them by the Pokanoket Wamsutta. John Woodcock established a settlement in the territory in 1669 which subsisted on agriculture, fishing and hunting. By 1670, Woodcock had received a license to open a tavern. The settlement was attacked during King Philip's War, with two killed and one home burned, but the Garrison house which Woodcock had built survived the attack. The Woodcock-Garrison house was used as sleeping quarters for George Washington on his army's march to Boston to rid the city of General Thomas Gage's troops.
The Town of Attleborough was incorporated from this territory in 1694.

In about 1780, a French settler named Lazarus Periera set up a forge for working brass, beginning the industrial era. Englishmen brought with them British machinery from Birmingham in 1794 and designed American improvements in button making, which they patented. During the 18th and early 19th centuries, small grist and sawmills were built along the Ten Mile River, and subsequently-established nail factories were eventually eclipsed by cotton spinning mills. The development of cotton spinning was spurred by the embargo on imports resulting from the War of 1812. Textiles and jewelry manufacturing were the staple industries of the town by 1832, but buttons became king, spurred by the American Civil War and U.S. Army orders for badges and medals. By 1834, Attleborough produced more buttons than anywhere else in the United States; by 1855, there were 24 shops making almost $1 million in jewelry in Attleborough.

In 1887, the residents of the village of East Attleborough voted to secede, and they had higher population and votes to take with them the name of Attleborough and the town's original founding date of 1694; they incorporated as the new City of Attleborough, and the remainder of the original town adopted the name North Attleborough.

In the twentieth century, North Attleborough was home at various times to the jewelry firms Jostens, the world's largest class ring manufacturer, and the Balfour Company, prominent maker of championship rings, including for the National Football League's Super Bowl champions and Major League Baseball's World Series' winners. In 2006, North Attleborough was rated in the top ten for professional sports communities in the entire country and was also listed as one of the most affordable and safest places to raise a family.  Today, North Attleborough is still home to many professional athletes due to its proximity to Gillette Stadium just 5 miles away.

Geography

The town is roughly quadrilateral-shaped, and makes the northwest corner of Bristol County. It is bordered by Plainville to the north, Mansfield to the east, Attleborough to the south, and Cumberland, Rhode Island to the west. Localities include Adamsdale, Attleborough Falls and Sheldonville Farms.

The town has several rivers, streams and brooks running through it, including the Ten Mile River and the Seven Mile River. There are several ponds and lakes, including Greenwood Lake (site of a fish hatchery) and Falls Pond, among others. World War I Memorial Park features a petting zoo, Petti Field for soccer and lacrosse and a ski/sledding hill with J-bar ski lift which is currently inoperable. There is also the North Attleborough Arboretum adjacent to the park.

On High Street, one block from Route 1A is an ice-skating pond called Titus Pond which is maintained by the North Attleborough Rotary Club and filled each winter by the Fire Department.

There are five cemeteries in North Attleborough: the diminutive and inactive Woodcock Cemetery across from the Woodcock-Garrison house just north of downtown; Paine Road Cemetery near the Cumberland, Rhode Island, border; Mt. Hope Cemetery & Arboretum; the old St. Mary's Cemetery and the new St. Mary's Cemetery. The latter three are located in the village of Attleborough Falls.

Demographics

At the 2000 census, there were 27,143 people, 10,391 households and 7,232 families residing in the town. The racial makeup of the town was 95.97% White, 0.92% African American, 0.12% Native American, 1.71% Asian, 0.02% Pacific Islander, 0.45% from other races, and 0.81% from two or more races. Hispanic or Latino of any race were 1.32% of the population.

There were 10,391 households, of which 36.0% had children under the age of 18 living with them, 57.0% were married couples living together, 9.4% had a female householder with no husband present, and 30.4% were non-families. 24.7% of all households were made up of individuals, and 7.3% had someone living alone who was 65 years of age or older. The average household size was 2.60 and the average family size was 3.15.

Age distribution was 26.9% under the age of 18, 6.6% from 18 to 24, 34.4% from 25 to 44, 22.5% from 45 to 64, and 9.7% who were 65 years of age or older. The median age was 36 years. For every 100 females, there were 94.6 males. For every 100 females age 18 and over, there were 91.3 males.

The median household income in 2016 was $90,125 compared to $59,371 in 2000.  About 2.7% of families and 3.8% of the population were below the poverty line, including 5.0% of those under age 18 and 3.9% of those age 65 or over.

Arts and culture

Library

"The North Attleborough Public Library was established in 1889, by the North Attleborough Union Improvement District, which turned its library over to the town." Today the Richards Memorial Library is located downtown, and is a member of SAILS Library Network, a network of libraries in Southeastern Massachusetts. In fiscal year 2008, the town spent 0.77% ($572,874) of its budget on its public library—approximately $20 per person, per year ($24.49 adjusted for inflation to 2021).

Points of interest

Angle Tree Stone
Emerald Square
North Attleborough Town Center Historic District

Government

State and national government
North Attleborough is represented in the Massachusetts House of Representatives by Adam Scanlon (D-Attleboro) as part of the Fourteenth Bristol district, which also includes sections of Attleborough and Mansfield.  Scanlon won the 2020 election after incumbent Elizabeth "Betty" Poirier (R-North Attleborough), having served since 1999, announced she would not run for another term.  In the State Senate, North Attleborough is represented by Becca Rausch (D-Needham) as part of the Norfolk, Bristol & Middlesex district, which includes the towns of Wayland, Sherborn, Millis, Norfolk, Wrentham and Plainville as well as sections of Natick, Wellesley, Needham, Franklin and Attleborough. Rausch won the seat after defeating the incumbent, Richard Ross (R-Wrentham) in 2018.

On the national level, North Attleborough is a part of Massachusetts's 4th congressional district in the United States House of Representatives represented by Jake Auchincloss (D-Newton). In the United States Senate it is represented by Elizabeth Warren (D-Cambridge) and Ed Markey (D-Malden).

Local government and services
Until 2019, North Attleborough has had a representative town meeting form of government, with an elected board of selectmen and a town administrator appointed by the selectmen. On April 2, 2019, North Attleboro voters approved a new structure for town government, a town charter creating a "strong" city manager that will replace the Board of Selectmen and a nine-member City Council replacing the 135-seat Representative Town Meeting. The new charter went into effect on July 1, 2019, following a June 18, 2019 special election for town council.

Education

Public schools

The Town of North Attleboro has a robust public school system.  The North Attleborough Public School District runs 8 public schools and has a total enrollment of approximately 4,000 students.  The current superintendent is John Antonucci.  There are 7 elected School Committee members.  Students are also part of formal School Committee proceedings.  In 2019, the school department expenditures were $60,745,000 with a per pupil average expenditure of $13,850.

In April 2018, citizens voted and approved a $6.5 million increased tax levy after the town's budget needs were lagging.  The tax override was, in part (approximately 40%), to increase funding for the public schools.  Even with the fiscal conservative history of the town, the override passed with 57% of voters approving the measure.  The town made immediate investments to advance school infrastructure projects and staffing, public safety and community services.

Massachusetts has the nation's top-ranked public schools, and North Attleborough Public Schools (NAPS) has received high marks for Academics, Quality Teachers, College Prep, and Health & Safety, according to niche.com and other sources.

The following schools make up the North Attleborough Public Schools:

 The Early Learning Center (Preschool) 
 Amvet Boulevard School (Grades K–5)
 Community School (Grades K–5)
 Falls School (Grades K–5)
 Joseph W. Martin Jr. School (Grades K–5)
 Roosevelt Avenue School (Grades K–5)
 North Attleborough Middle School (Grades 6–8)
 North Attleborough High School (Grades 9–12)

Private schools

The town is home to one Catholic K–8 school, Saint Mary-Sacred Heart School. The nearest private high school is Bishop Feehan High School in Attleboro, a Catholic high school.

Infrastructure

Transportation

Interstates 95 and 295 meet just over the Attleborough line, and both run through the town. Each interstate has one exit within town. The town is also bisected by U.S. Route 1, which runs through the retail and downtown districts. Massachusetts state routes 120 and 152 also run through town, as does the "middle" portion of Route 1A, which begins in the town.

The town is set equidistantantly between the three nearest Massachusetts Bay Transportation Authority stops, in Mansfield, Attleborough Center and South Attleborough. The Greater Attleboro Taunton Regional Transit Authority provides bus services between the local towns and cities. The nearest national-level airport is T.F. Green Airport in Rhode Island, approximately 23 miles away, and the nearest international airport is Logan International Airport in Boston, approximately 42 miles away.

Police

The North Attleborough Police Department is located downtown in the old H.F. Barrows Manufacturing Company Building at 102 South Washington St. There are three fire stations, located downtown on Elm Street just off Route 1, Allen Ave behind Emerald Square Mall and on Route 152 in the eastern portion of town. There are also two post offices, downtown (using the 02760 ZIP code) and in Attleboro Falls (02763).  North Attleboro also uses 02761 for post office boxes located downtown.

Revitalization projects 

The Balfour Co. Building in North Attleboro was a branch of the L.G. Balfour Company, a jewelry company that employed many residents of Attleboro and North Attleboro, and is a significant part of the town’s history. The building, left abandoned for decades, is a prime example of urban blight in the town and was often regarded as the town’s biggest eyesore, as it was incredibly run down and dilapidated. In a 2014 attempt to begin revitalizing the town, developers expressed interest in the Balfour building and plans were underway to build a new apartment building and bus stop in its place. However, after an initial overhaul of the area’s infrastructure, such as water mains and streets, the developers pulled out after being unable to finance the forty million dollar revitalization.

In 2017, Boston Realty Advisors secured a loan that will allow them to completely develop the area of the old Balfour building into a Class A apartment complex that will have 193 units and 11,500 square feet of retail space. This mixed-use zoning / development allows for one development to house different functions—the new building on 21 East Street will have a gym, restaurant, retail space, and shuttles to MBTA stations in addition to the apartments. This transit-oriented development places residents close to public transportation, which reduces travel times. Both the mixed-use development and the transit-oriented development combat urban sprawl, which is all too common in the Boston-Providence suburbs. The new apartment complex will not only bring large amounts of tax revenue to North Attleboro, but create new Class A, a type of luxury apartment, that will bring in high-income tenants.

Though this infill of an old, abandoned building is beneficial in many ways and a useful response to blight occurring in the town, an oversight by planners and developers regarding the drainage of a swamp that used to exist beneath U.S. Route 1 shifted environmental burdens towards neighboring, lower-income households. The new building at 21 East Street has shifted drainage and flooded nearby homes, according to residents. In spite of these complaints, the town gave the developers permission to open two of three buildings, while they have sixty days to address the drainage problem; this issue raised concerns and questions about the role of municipal governments in overseeing such large and impactful projects.

Notable people

 Nolan Buckley, Major League Rugby player for the Dallas Jackals
 Colin Grafton, Team USA figure skater, 2012 National bronze Medalist, 2012 Junior World Team Member
 Aaron Hernandez, former New England Patriots tight end and convicted murderer
 William J. Maguire (1916–1997), politician who served in the New Jersey General Assembly from 1976 to 1982.
 Joseph W. Martin, Jr., Republican US representative, Speaker of the House of Representatives; J.W. Martin Elementary School is named in his honor
 Jerod Mayo, coach and linebacker both for the New England Patriots
 Steve Pearce, professional baseball player
 Allen Ripley, professional baseball player
 Anthony Sherman, professional football player
 Nick Sinacola, professional baseball player in the San Francisco Giants baseball team
 Chris Sullivan, former defensive end for the New England Patriots and the Pittsburgh Steelers
 Frank C. Whitmore, organic chemist

In popular culture
 Right There, an award-winning 2013 silent comedy film, was filmed in downtown North Attleboro.
 In How to Marry a Millionaire (1953 film starring Lauren Bacall and Marilyn Monroe) one of the ladies' dates mentions his aunt is from North Attleborough, Massachusetts.

References

External links

 The Town of North Attleborough Web Site

 
Providence metropolitan area
Towns in Bristol County, Massachusetts
Towns in Massachusetts